The Near Future is the second album by I Fight Dragons, released on December 9, 2014, the album was originally planned for a September 16, 2014 release date but for unknown reasons was pushed back. It includes a ten-track concept storytelling arc of songs with five additional tracks.

The album was funded by a successful Kickstarter campaign known as Project Atma. It reached No. 32 on the Billboard Top Rock Albums chart and No. 5 on the Billboard Vinyl Albums chart upon its release.

Track listing

Personnel
Brian Mazzaferri: lead vocals, acoustic guitar, chiptune 
Hari Rao: bass
Packy Lundholm: vocals, electric guitar
Chad Van Dahm: drums

References 

2014 albums
I Fight Dragons albums
Science fiction concept albums
Self-released albums